Zothanmawia Pachuau (born 6 September 1997) is an Indian professional footballer who plays as a goalkeeper for Mohammedan in the I-League.

Club career
Born in Aizawl, Mizoram, Zothanmawia started his career with the Chandigarh Football Academy. In 2011, after helping the academy win the 56th National School Games at the under-14 level, Zothanmawia was named as the best goalkeeper in the tournament. He was then a part of the Chandigarh U16 side that participated in the Mir Iqbal Hussain Trophy in 2012. After guiding Chandigarh U16 to the final against Assam, Zothanmawia could not prevent his side from defeat as Chandigarh lost 2–0 at the Fatorda Stadium.

In 2012, Zothanmawia returned to Mizoram to join Dinthar Football Club in the Mizoram Premier League. He played for the senior side for two seasons.

Aizawl
In 2014, after spending two years with Dinthar, Zothanmawia signed for Aizawl for the I-League 2nd Division season. He contributed to the club during their 2015 season in which Aizawl earned promotion to the I-League, keeping a clean-sheet against Chanmari. After earning promotion, Zothanmawia was named into the squad for the 2015 Mizoram Premier League season.

On 9 January 2016, Zothanmawia was selected to the team for the club's first I-League match against Mohun Bagan. He remained on the bench throughout the match as Aizawl lost 3–1. Zothanmawia then made his professional debut for the club on 22 January 2016 against DSK Shivajians. He kept a clean-sheet as Aizawl won their first match in the I-League 2–0.

International career
In 2011, Zothanmawia was invited to attend a camp for the India U16 side. However, he did not appear for the team.

Career statistics

Club

Honours
Mohammedan Sporting
I-League: 2021–22

References

External links 
 Aizawl Football Club Profile.
 ZoFooty Profile.

1997 births
Living people
People from Aizawl
Indian footballers
Aizawl FC players
Association football goalkeepers
Footballers from Mizoram

I-League 2nd Division players
I-League players
Chhinga Veng FC players
Mizoram Premier League players
Calcutta Football League players
Mohammedan SC (Kolkata) players